Frances Ellen 'Nell' Truman Robinson (12 December 1945 – 8 April 2012), was a female tennis player from the United Kingdom who was active in the 1960s and early 1970s and was mainly known for her performance as a doubles player.

Nell Truman was born on 12 December 1945 in Loughton, England, the youngest child of Stanley and Aimee Truman. Her father was a chartered accountant. She was the sister of tennis player Christine Truman. She attended Queen Anne's School in Caversham, Berkshire, and went on to read geography at St Anne's College, Oxford, where she was awarded blues in tennis and squash. She won a gold medal in the singles event at the 1967 World Student Games in Tokyo.

Her best performance at a Grand Slam tournament was reaching the final of the doubles event at the 1972 French Open. Partnering compatriot Winnie Shaw, they lost the final in straight sets to Billie Jean King and Betty Stöve. Her best Grand Slam singles performance was reaching the fourth round of the 1969 Wimbledon Championships in which she lost to Judy Tegart.

Between 1965 and 1972, Truman played in five Wightman Cups, a team tennis competition for women between the United States and Great Britain. During the 1968 Wightman Cup, the match was tied at three all, and Nell partnered sister Christine in the deciding rubber. The sisters won the match, and Nell hit the winning shot to give the British team a victory, their first triumph over the U.S. team since 1960.

In February 1968, she won the singles title at the French Covered Courts Championships in Paris. At the Alexandria Championships in Egypt, played in March 1968, she defeated Olga Morozova in the final to win the singles title.

In April 1968, she and her sister became the first winners of an open tennis event by winning the women's doubles title at the British Hard Court Championships in Bournemouth. In February 1971, she won the singles title at the German Indoor Tennis Championships in Bremen, defeating Heide Orth in the final in straight sets. In 1972, she joined the Virginia Slims tennis circuit.

She married Christopher Robinson, a London solicitor, on 7 October 1972 with whom she had a son and three daughters. Nell Truman died in Cambridge on 8 April 2012 as a result of a stroke.

Grand Slam finals

Doubles (1 runner-up)

References

External links
 

1945 births
2012 deaths
English female tennis players
People educated at Queen Anne's School
People from Loughton
British female tennis players
Tennis people from Essex
Universiade medalists in tennis
Universiade gold medalists for Great Britain
Universiade bronze medalists for Great Britain
Medalists at the 1967 Summer Universiade